Florin Amedeo Bogardo (born 16 August 1942 in Bucharest; died 15 August 2009 in Bucharest) was a Romanian composer and singer. He died after a long illness at age 67. Bogardo was the husband of Stela Enache, also a singer, his wife.

Creations
 Tu, aprinsă stea
 Iarna
 Cîndva o luntre albă
 Ani de liceu
 Definiţie
 Apari, iubire
 Taci!
 Despre lucruri
 N-ai să mă poţi uita
 Balada pescăruşilor albaştri
 Rugăciune
 Ora cântecului
 De n-ar fi cărările
 E o poveste de amor
 Cândva arborii aveau ochi
 De câte ori ești lângă mine
 Cum e oare?
 Mă uit la tine, toamnă
 Plop înfrînt
 Iubirea cea mare
 Ce simți când ești îndrăgostit
 Ceramica
 Vorbe banale
 Variațiuni pe o romanță veche
 Izvorul nopţii
 Să nu uităm trandafirii
 Întrebare
 Un vis romantic
 Apa vieţii
 Într-o zi cînd m-am născut
 Tu eşti primăvara mea
 Luna pămînteană
 Absența
 Apleacă-te lin
 Adevărul despre alchimie
 Un fluture şi o pasăre
 Iertarea
 Dacă iubeşti fără să speri
 Dintre sute de catarge
 Tablouri
 Un acoperiș
 La steaua
 Vino-n codru la izvor
 Un om, o viaţă
 Orice om
 Strofe de-a lungul anilor
 O floare albă
 Obstacolul invizibil
 Să pot
 Eminescu, ţie!
 Trandafirul
 În numele iubirii
 Ca un tren ne pare viața
 Frumoaso cu ochi limpezi
 Cum plouă azi peste iubirea noastră
 Primul vals
 Dorul, flacără nebună
 Dimineţile mele
 Nicăieri
 (Tema din filmul) Raliul
 Un cîntec pentru ţara mea
 Iubirea mea, pămîntul stramoșesc
 Onor soarelui
 O, te-am iubit!
 Ca tine nu e nimeni
 Flori de cîmp
 Ca o chemare
 Miracolul iubirii
 Vraja sărutului
 Să compun o balada
 Cînd amintirile..
 Ochiul tău iubit
 Ceas de taină
 E primăvara profesor
 Fără lună, fără stele

References

1942 births
2009 deaths
20th-century Romanian male singers
20th-century Romanian singers
Romanian people of Italian descent